Hexalectris spicata, the spiked crested coralroot, is a terrestrial, myco-heterotrophic orchid lacking chlorophyll and subsisting entirely on nutrients obtained from mycorrhizal fungi in the soil. It is native to Arizona, New Mexico, Texas and Coahuila. It is closely related to H. arizonica and the two are sometimes considered varieties of the same species. Hexalectris spicata is endemic to the southern half of the United States from Arizona east to Florida and north to Maryland and the Ohio Valley.

References

External links
Florida's Native and Naturalized Orchids, Crested Coralroot (Hexalectris spicata)
Go Orchids, North American Orchid Conservation Center,  Crested Coralroot (Hexalectris spicata)
Lady Bird Johnson Wildflower Center, University of Texas @ Austin, Hexalectris spicata
Florida Native Orchid Blog, The hunt to photograph Florida's native orchids and incidental related things, the rare and beautiful crested coralroot, Hexalectris spicata

Bletiinae
Myco-heterotrophic orchids
Orchids of Mexico
Orchids of the United States
Plants described in 1882